is a monthly Japanese seinen manga magazine, published on the 5th each month by Media Factory since November 5, 1999 as a successor to Comic Alpha. The magazine celebrated its 100th issue on February 5, 2008 (March issue 2008). 

On July 13, 2022, a supplemental magazine for Flapper called Monthly Comic Alunna  began publishing. Alunna will focus on manga by notable online influencers and creators, with some titles currently being published in Flapper moving to the new magazine.

Serialized titles
7 Billion Needles
Atagoul ha neko no mori by Hiroshi Masumura (1999-2011)
Brave 10
Candy Boy
Chio-chan no Tsūgakuro
Dance in the Vampire Bund
Denkigai no Honya-san
Fantastic Children
Girls und Panzer
Guin Saga
Kage Kara Mamoru!
Kamisama Kazoku
Kuma Miko: Girl Meets Bear (ongoing)
Locke the Superman (ongoing)
Madan no Ō to Vanadis
Lycoris Recoil (ongoing)
Math Girls
Mushoku Tensei
My Wife Has No Emotion (ongoing)
Najica Blitz Tactics
Nijū Mensō no Musume
Overman King Gainer
Space Adventure Cobra: Magic Doll
Tate no Yuusha no Nariagari (ongoing)
Togari Shiro
Tonari no Seki-kun (ongoing)
Tono to Issho
Translucent
Twin Spica
Vamos Lá!
Young Ladies Don't Play Fighting Games (ongoing)

References

External links
Comic Flapper official website 

1999 establishments in Japan
Monthly manga magazines published in Japan
Magazines established in 1999
Seinen manga magazines
Media Factory magazines